Petra Nováková (born 17 August 1993 in Karlovy Vary) is a Czech cross-country skier.

She competed at the FIS Nordic World Ski Championships 2013 in Val di Fiemme. She competed at the 2014 Winter Olympics in Sochi, in the sprint, skiathlon, relay and 30 kilometers. She competed at the 2022 Winter Olympics, in Women's 10 kilometre classical, Women's 30 kilometre freestyle, Women's 15 kilometre skiathlon, and Women's 4 × 5 kilometre relay.

Cross-country skiing results
All results are sourced from the International Ski Federation (FIS).

Olympic Games

World Championships

World Cup

Season standings

References

External links

 

1993 births
Living people
Cross-country skiers at the 2014 Winter Olympics
Cross-country skiers at the 2018 Winter Olympics
Cross-country skiers at the 2022 Winter Olympics
Czech female cross-country skiers
Tour de Ski skiers
Olympic cross-country skiers of the Czech Republic
Czech mountain runners
Sportspeople from Karlovy Vary